Mere Brother Ki Dulhan is a 2011 Indian Hindi-language romantic comedy film written and directed by Ali Abbas Zafar in his directorial debut and produced by Aditya Chopra for Yash Raj Films. It stars Imran Khan, Katrina Kaif, Ali Zafar, and Tara D'Souza. In the film, Dimple Dixit (Kaif) and Luv Agnihotri (Zafar) are due to get married, but difficulties arise when Dimple and Kush (Khan) develop feelings for each other in the days leading up to the wedding. 

Mere Brother Ki Dulhan entered development in August 2010 after Zafar, then known as an assistant director, wrote three separate screenplays for Yash Raj. Khan and Kaif's involvement was announced soon thereafter, marking Khan's first film for Yash Raj and Kaif and Zafar's second, after New York (2009). Casting was rounded out with the hirings of Zafar and D'Souza in their initial Bollywood roles and principal photography began in September 2010 and lasted until that November, with filming locations including Haryana, Uttar Pradesh, Uttarakhand, Punjab, and Himachal Pradesh. Upon release, the film received plagiarism allegations, drawing comparisons to Mere Yaar Ki Shaadi Hai (2002) and Dan in Real Life (2007).

Mere Brother Ki Dulhan was set for release in July 2011, but was unexpectedly postponed. It was theatrically released in India by Sony Pictures Networks on September 9 the same year. Mere Brother Ki Dulhan grossed  worldwide, making it the ninth highest grossing Indian language film of 2011. It received positive reviews from critics, with particular praise directed towards Kaif's performance as well as its screenplay, soundtrack and humor. 

At the 57th Filmfare Awards, Mere Brother Ki Dulhan received 2 nominations – Best Actress (Kaif) and Best Music Director (Sohail Sen).

Plot
After breaking up with his girlfriend, Piyali Patel in London, Luv Agnihotri insists his younger brother Kush, an assistant film director and photographer in Mumbai, to find him a bride. Kush reaches home to meet his army veteran father, Col. (Retd.) Swank Agnihotri and homemaker mother Kanak and travels with them all over India to find a bride suitable for Luv but in vain. His friends come up with an idea to advertise this in a newspaper. A certain Dilip Dixit from Agra responds to the advertisement, claiming that he is looking for a suitable groom for his daughter. However, when Kush travels with his parents to Agra to meet the Dixit family, he is shocked to find out that the prospective bride is none other than Dimple "D" Dixit, who he had previously met during a chance encounter on a college outing five years ago.

Obnoxious and loud, Dimple is everything that Kush is not, but he pleads not to create a scene and asks her to consider the alliance. After meeting Luv, Dimple agrees to marry him. Her brother Ajay wants them to get married at a place in Agra from where the Taj Mahal is visible. However, during the wedding preparations, Kush realizes he has feelings for Dimple, and she initially responds by slapping him as to why he didn't tell her before. Later, they try to elope, but it doesn't work out, and they return, planning to distract Luv. Eventually, on the eve of the wedding, Dimple brings Piyali, a mutual friend, to Agra, and Luv, figuring out he still has feelings for Piyali, elopes the next day. They get married according to religious customs, with Luv sending letters to the Agnihotri and Dixit families explaining the reasons behind his elopement.

After reading the letters, Dilip and Swarnik have a bitter fight but figure that the only way to protect their respect and pride is to get Kush and Dimple married. However, Kush maintains a condition that he will marry Dimple only if Luv and Piyali are accepted. The family agrees, with both couples enjoying a proper, lavish wedding. They live happily ever after together.

Cast

 Imran Khan as Kush Agnihotri
 Katrina Kaif as Dimple "D" Dixit
 Ali Zafar as Luv Agnihotri
 Tara D'Souza as Piyali Patel
 Sufi Malhotra as Robin
 Parikshit Sahni as Colonel Swarnik Agnihotri
 Kanwaljit Singh as Dilip Dixit
 Suparna Marwah as Kanak Agnihotri
Karmveer Choudhary as Hariyanvi girl's father 
 Marhu Sheikh as Lata Dixit
 Arfeen Khan as Ajay Dixit
 Mohammed Zeeshan Ayyub as Shobhit
 Tariq Vasudeva as Rohit
 Brijendra Kala as Salman Bhai
 John Abraham in a special appearance as himself
 Iain Fraser as Scottish tourist pushing airport cart
 Kyra Dutt in a special song appearance in the title track

Production

Development
Yash Raj Films announced the then-untitled project on 5 August 2010. Ali Abbas Zafar, who was an assistant director on a number of Yash Raj Films productions such as Jhoom Barabar Jhoom, Tashan, New York and Badmaash Company, made his feature writing and directing debut with this film, which has been described as a "comedy of errors" by lead actor Imran Khan. After Band Baaja Baaraat (2010), this marks the second Yash Raj Films production in a row to be helmed by a first-time director who was previously an assistant director. Zafar is originally from Dehradun, where much of the story is set. After years of working with Yash Raj Films, he submitted three love stories to producer Aditya Chopra, who eventually greenlit Mere Brother Ki Dulhan, enabling Zafar to start writing his 150-page long script. Ali Abbas Zafar is an alumnus of The Players, the acclaimed theatre society of Kirori Mal College, University of Delhi, where he acted in different plays including an adaptation of William Golding's Lord of the Flies.

Like many Bollywood films, Mere Brother Ki Dulhan has suffered allegations that it is a rip-off of an American film even before filming wrapped. According to these sources, the film rips off Dan in Real Life (2007), in which Steve Carell's character also falls in love with his brother's girlfriend (played by Dane Cook and Juliette Binoche respectively). The film has also drawn comparison to an earlier Yash Raj Films production, Mere Yaar Ki Shaadi Hai (2002).

Casting
Katrina Kaif and Imran Khan play the romantic leads in the film, and their involvement was announced in the same press release as the initial production company announcement. This is the first time they've been paired together. They were initially to star together in 7 Days in Paris for director Sanjay Gadhvi, but the film has been indefinitely postponed. some media publications have alleged that their casting was an attempt by Yash Raj Films to end a recent string of box-office flops and disappointments. While the film was Imran Khan's first for Yash Raj Films, Katrina Kaif had previously worked with them (and then assistant director Ali Abbas Zafar) on the critical and commercial hit New York (2009). She was able to take the role thanks to the postponement of Dostana 2 to which she was already committed. Her role has been reported in the media as different from the characters she had played in the past. It was then given to Ali Zafar (no relation to the director), an actor who'd received rave reviews for his debut film Tere Bin Laden (2010) and who confirmed his participation via his Twitter account. A popular singer, Zafar will also perform his character's singing in the film and described his casting as "a dream come true" and his role as a "parallel lead role". The film additionally stars a new actress Tara D'Souza who is a former Kingfisher model.

On 17 October 2010, several media outlets reported on the casting of Preity Zinta in an unspecified "glamorous role". The actress however quickly denied the report on her official Twitter page.

Filming
Filming started on 25 September 2010 and was scheduled to be completed by November. and Pataudi, before moving on to Chandigarh, Agra, Dehradun, Mussoorie, Haridwar, Dhanaulti, Punjab and Himachal Pradesh for a total of 45 days of filming in northern India and finally finishing the film in Mumbai. Juggling between this film and the final shots of Tees Maar Khan and Zindagi Na Milegi Dobara, Kaif joined the shoot on 27 September.

A bloody incident happened very early in the shoot, on 29 September, while the crew was filming at Pataudi Palace. The scene being shot, comic in nature, involved Imran Khan pulling Katrina Kaif towards him while pointing a gun towards other cast members. However, Khan miscalculated the move and instead sent the gun barrel crashing into Kaif's nose, causing it to bleed profusely. Kaif was quoted as saying "I am pretty bruised but the staff feels it's good luck for the film. But it was a funny scene so I think it was worth it" and "Please don't make it seem as if Imran was careless or something. These things happen. We were shooting one of the really madcap scenes where the actors' limbs acquire a life of their own. Imran's hand landed on my face" Another incident of sorts was reported by the media in early October and involves an emotional scene where Kaif's character slaps Khan's. Kaif would have been content to slap Khan once, however, he insisted on sixteen takes so that the director would have a variety of slaps to choose from. Kaif was involved in another accident a few weeks later while filming in Nabha. Her hair got caught in a fan, and it was thanks to co-star Ali Zafar's quick action that the incident didn't turn more serious. Zafar and a spot boy named Raju did however sustain minor injuries and bruises. The film's title, Mere Brother Ki Dulhan, was revealed on 2 October along with a few promo pictures. Ali Zafar stated that Kaif promised him that if the film made over  600 million at the box office, she would do a music video with him.

Release
Yash Raj Films were first aiming for a July 2011 release, but the release date was later pushed to 16 September 2011. The studio drastically changed their marketing tactics with this film by revealing the title and two stills a week into filming, whereas they have previously been very secretive about sharing such information until about a couple of months before the theatrical release. It was released in Pakistan on 9 September 2011.

Critical reception
The film received positive reviews from critics, with particular praise directed towards Kaif's performance. 

Taran Adarsh of Bollywood Hungama awarded it 4 out of 5 stars and wrote, "On the whole, Mere Brother Ki Dulhan is a delectably wholesome, heartening, feel-good entertainer." Shivesh Kumar of IndiaWeekly awarded the movie 4 out of 5 stars. Daily Bhaskar awarded the movie 3 out of 5 stars and wrote, "Surely a treat for Katrina's fans, as it will be an experience to witness her talent." Komal Nahta of Koimoi gave it 3 out of 5 stars and said, "Mere Brother Ki Dulhan has reasonable entertainment value, very good music, exciting song picturisations which will all result in a good run at the box-office", but " The screenplay dips at a few places; a few comic scenes seem forced." Sukanya Verma of Rediff rated it 3.5 out of 5 stars and said, "At the end of the day, Mere Brother Ki Dulhan is a pretty ordinary effort. It's the kind of movie where everyone looks catalogue cool and beams with enthusiasm to make the going-ons appear droll and exciting." Kaveree Bamzai of India Today also gave it 3.5 stars and wrote, "A large part of the film is a spoof—from Dabangg to My Name Is Khan. Some of it also an ode—from Padosan to Mughal e Azam. Some of it works, a lot of it doesn't." Gaurav Malani of The Times of India wrote, "The screenplay fails to tap the little potential that the story offers (esp. in the second half) pretty much like the film fails to exploit the talent of Ali Zafar. The writing is shallow and resorts to a convenient climax." Krita Coelho of Gulf News wrote, " Watch if you're a sucker for a sweet Bollywood romance." Reuters wrote, "If you are willing to ignore some flaws", Mere Brother Ki Dulhan "is a fun good one-time watch." Rahul Gangwani from Filmfare gave it 3 out of 5 stars and called it Knot recommend however he praised the performance of the lead actress and added: "the film ultimately belongs to Katrina Kaif. She sparkles, sizzles and infuses energy into the film. Watch out for the scene where she breaks into the shehnai rendition from Ashutosh Gowariker Swades." Rajeev Masand in his review for CNN-IBN called the film too predictable and said: "The film doesn't always work because it relies too heavily on silly stereotypes and clichés, and because you can see exactly where it's going from the moment you settle into your seat. I'm going with two out of five for director Ali Abbas Zafar's Mere Brother Ki Dulhan. Aside from a few enjoyable moments, this film recycles so much that you've already seen before." Hamara Bollywood gave the film 4 out of 5 stars and said that Katrina Kaif's performance alone 'is worth paying the admission price.'

Box office

India

Mere Brother Ki Dulhan has had a good opening with first day of 75.0 million net, It had a good first weekend of 255.0 million net. the film held up well on Monday with business of the 37.5 million net mark, taking its four-day business to Rs 290 million net. It grossed  net in the first week of its release. Thus it became the ninth highest-grossing film of 2011.

Overseas

The film collected  from overseas markets.

Soundtrack

The score and soundtrack of the film was composed by Sohail Sen, best known for being the man behind the music of What's Your Raashee? (2009). Lyrics are penned by Irshad Kamil, the first working between Sohail Sen and Irshad Kamil. Ali Zafar sings one song in the film. "Madhubala", the song picturized on Katrina Kaif was a tribute to yesteryear's popular actress Madhubala. The music was released on 9 August 2011. The album contains six original tracks and two remixes.

Reception
The soundtrack of the film received positive reviews from music critics. Joginder Tuteja of Bollywood Hungama rated the album favorably, awarding it 3.5/5, stating "Mere Brother Ki Dulhan is a winning album by all means and has in it to be widely popular in days to come. As expected, the entire soundtrack follows a fun approach without anything becoming overtly mushy or mellow. Composer Sohail Sen can be assured that he would now have a successful soundtrack to his name as well that would find a wide audience for itself." This is the music director's third work so far, the first two being What's Your Raashee and Khelein Hum Jee Jaan Sey (2010). Nikhil Hemrajani of Hindustan Times wrote, "That all eight songs in Mere Brother Ki Dulhan'''s (MBKD'') soundtrack are high-energy thumpers probably makes sense for the coming festive season. But there's nothing special about the music, so to speak."

Accolades

References

External links
 
 
 

Films scored by Sohail Sen
2011 romantic comedy-drama films
2010s Hindi-language films
Films set in Delhi
Films set in India
Films shot in India
Yash Raj Films films
2011 films
Films shot in Uttarakhand
Indian romantic comedy-drama films
Films directed by Ali Abbas Zafar
2011 directorial debut films